Randolph/Wabash was an elevated 'L' station in the Loop. Located at Randolph Street and Wabash Avenue, it served trains running on the CTA's Brown and Green Lines on the outer loop track, and the Green, Orange, Pink, and Purple Lines on the inner loop track. Randolph/Wabash was the closest 'L' station to Metra's Millennium Station until its closure on September 3, 2017. The station was later demolished.

History
Randolph/Wabash opened on November 8, 1896, to be used by trains on the Lake Street Elevated Railroad (now the western section of the Green Line). The original inner loop station house was replaced in 1957, and the outer loop station house was removed in the 1960s. On September 3, 2017, Randolph/Wabash closed, three days after its replacement, Washington/Wabash station, opened.

In popular culture
Randolph/Wabash was used for exterior shots in the 1995 film While You Were Sleeping. The station also appeared in the 1987 film Adventures in Babysitting. In addition, a 2015 Apple advertising campaign, "Shot on iPhone 6", features the short journey between Randolph/Wabash and State/Lake shot in time lapse.

Gallery

Notes and references

Notes

References

External links

Randolph/Wabash Station Page at Chicago-L.org
Randolph Street entrance from Google Maps Street View

CTA Brown Line stations
CTA Green Line stations
CTA Orange Line stations
CTA Purple Line stations
CTA Pink Line stations
Historic American Engineering Record in Chicago
Railway stations in the United States opened in 1896
Former North Shore Line stations
Defunct Chicago "L" stations
Railway stations closed in 2017